Jutulgryta Crevasses is a crevasse field about  long, at the east side of the mouth of Jutulstraumen Glacier in Queen Maud Land, Antarctica. It was mapped by Norwegian cartographers from surveys and air photos by the Norwegian–British–Swedish Antarctic Expedition (1949–52) and from air photos by the Norwegian expedition (1958–59) and named Jutulgryta (the giant's caldron).

References

Crevasse fields of Queen Maud Land
Princess Martha Coast